Scott Cameron McMann (born 9 July 1996) is a Scottish professional footballer who plays as a defender for Dundee United.

Club career
Raised in Torrance, East Dunbartonshire, McMann turned professional with Hamilton Academical in July 2012. He made his senior debut on 16 April 2013. In February 2016, McMann moved on loan to Scottish League Two side Clyde for the remainder of the 2015–16 season. In October 2019, he signed a new contract with Hamilton until 2022.

He signed for Dundee United on 31 August 2021.

International career
He has represented Scotland at under-16 and under-17 international levels.

Career statistics

References

1996 births
Living people
Scottish footballers
Sportspeople from East Dunbartonshire
Rossvale F.C. players
Hamilton Academical F.C. players
Clyde F.C. players
Dundee United F.C. players
Scottish Football League players
Association football defenders
Scotland youth international footballers
Scottish Professional Football League players
Place of birth missing (living people)